Witz may refer to:

People
 Bob Witz (born 1934), American artist
 Chaim Witz (born 1949), birth name of Gene Simmons, American musician, band member of Kiss
 Dan Witz (born 1957), Brooklyn-based street artist and realist painter
 Emanuel Witz (1717–1797), Swiss painter
 Konrad Witz, (c. 1400–1445), German painter
 Laurent Witz, filmmaker
 Sergio Witz Rodríguez (born 1962), Mexican poet

Geography
 Saint-Witz, commune in the Val-d'Oise department in Île-de-France in northern France
 Stadion in der Witz, stadium in Mainz-Kastel, Wiesbaden, Germany

Other uses
 Witz (novel), novel by Joshua Cohen
 Kwik Witz, syndicated comedy program
 Witz (וויץ) is Yiddish for "joke"
 WITZ (AM), a radio station (990 AM) licensed to Jasper, Indiana, United States
 WITZ-FM, a radio station (104.7 FM) licensed to Jasper, Indiana, United States
 Wake Island Time Zone, a time zone (UTC+12) in the U.S. territory of Wake Island

See also